Kandhili is a small township in the Vellore district of Tamil Nadu, India.

In Tamil; Kandu means "finance capital," hence the word Kandhili. The main business of this small town is moneylending. The population is approximately 20,000, the majority of which are Hindus and Muslims. This village also houses a branch of CMC hospital, Vellore.

Cities and towns in Vellore district